Dr. Mario 64 is a tile-matching action puzzle video game developed and published by Nintendo for the Nintendo 64. The game was released in North America on April 8, 2001. The game is an enhanced remake of Dr. Mario, which was originally released for the NES and Game Boy consoles in 1990, and is based around characters from the 2000 Game Boy Color game Wario Land 3. The game's soundtrack was composed by Seiichi Tokunaga, featuring arrangements of classic Dr. Mario tunes and new compositions.

The game received a Japanese release as part of the Nintendo Puzzle Collection compilation, released for the GameCube in 2003. The game was re-released on the Nintendo Switch Online + Expansion Pack in October 2021, marking its first release in PAL territories.

Gameplay

Like its predecessor, Dr. Mario 64 is a falling block tile-matching video game. The playing field is represented on-screen as a medicine bottle populated with viruses of three colors: red, blue, and yellow. The main objective of the game to clear the playing field of all the viruses using two-colored medical capsules dropped into the bottle. The player manipulates the capsules as they fall, moving them left or right and rotating such that they are positioned alongside the viruses and any existing capsules. When four or more capsule halves or viruses of the same colour are aligned in horizontal or vertical configurations, they are removed from play. The player receives a game over if the playing field fills up with capsules such that they obstruct the bottle's narrow neck. Points are awarded when viruses are destroyed.

There are several single-player modes present in the game:

 Classic - This mode features a similar set-up and design to the original Dr. Mario game.
 Story - In this mode, the player may take control of either Dr. Mario or Wario to track down the stolen Megavitamins, battling computer players on the way.
 Vs. Computer - In this mode, the player may battle against the computer as any character the player has played as or fought against.
 Flash - In this mode, the player must eliminate three particular flashing viruses faster than the computer can.
 Marathon - This mode consists of a never-ending rising field of viruses which does not end until the player quits or loses.
 Score Attack - In this mode, the player is given three minutes to clear all of the viruses as well as get a high score.

A multiplayer mode also allows up to four players to compete at once in Classic, Flash, or Score Attack gameplay.

Plot
The flu season has come about, and it is Dr. Mario's duty to use his Megavitamins to heal the people of the land. However, Wario, wanting to sell the pills to get rich, attempts to steal the Megavitamins, but to no avail. Afterwards, Mad Scienstein and Rudy the Clown steal the Megavitamins, and both Dr. Mario and Wario give chase. Throughout their adventure, both of them meet up with many creatures from Wario Land 3.  Most of the time the fights that emerge are really misunderstandings; for example, the player may accidentally bump into a creature, who gets angry and retaliates. Dr. Mario and Wario follow Mad Scienstein to Rudy's castle, where they fight Rudy to take back the vitamins. If the game is completed on Normal or Hard mode without using a continue, one last battle occurs after defeating Rudy; the opponent is Metal Mario for Wario and Vampire Wario for Dr. Mario.

Reception

Dr. Mario 64 in all of its various permutations was voted #76 in the Top 100 Games of All Time poll published by Game Informer in August 2001. IGN criticized the game for being "more of the same" and gave it a middling score of 5 out of 10. GameSpot gave the game 7 out of 10, summarizing that "Dr. Mario is a legitimate and satisfying puzzle game that is executed rather nicely in this four-player-focused package." It was a runner-up for GameSpots annual "Best Nintendo 64 Game" award, which went to Paper Mario.

Notes

References

External links

2001 video games
Dr. Mario games
Wario video games
Video game remakes
Nintendo 64 games
IQue games
Video games developed in Japan
Multiplayer and single-player video games
Nintendo Switch Online games
North America-exclusive video games